Syritta longiseta is a species of syrphid fly in the family Syrphidae.

Distribution
Cameroon, Congo, Eswatini, Kenya, Liberia, Malawi, Mozambique, Nigeria, South Africa, Tanzania, Uganda.

References

Eristalinae
Diptera of Africa
Insects described in 2005